Cecil De Cordova (8 February 1876 – 1948) was a Jamaican cricketer. He played in three first-class matches for the Jamaican cricket team in 1896/97.

See also
 List of Jamaican representative cricketers

References

External links
 

1876 births
1948 deaths
Jamaican cricketers
Jamaica cricketers
Sportspeople from Kingston, Jamaica